Chùa Linh-Sơn is a Buddhist Temple, located on 4604 Duval Rd. Austin, Texas.

Quick Stats 
 Leader/Title: Venerable Thich Tri-Hue
 Ethnic Composition: mostly Vietnamese, with a growing non-Vietnamese population
 Resident Monks: Venerable Thich Tri-Hue (abbot), Thich Hue-Minh (vice-abbot)
 Tradition: Mahayana

Demographics 

The community is predominantly Vietnamese, however, the temple is often visited by Chinese, Thais, Cambodians, Sri Lankans, Indians, and Westerners. Chanting services are conducted in Vietnamese. There are 3000-5000 Vietnamese Buddhists in Austin. There are about 200 students in the Vietnamese language and culture classes each week.

Center activities 

Major holidays at the Linh-Son temple include Trung Thu, a mid-autumn moon festival, Vu-Lan, a day honoring mothers that is similar to Mother’s day in America, Tet, the Vietnamese New Year (a.k.a. Lunar New Year), and the Buddha’s Birthday. Larger celebrations usually are held at the Leander temple which has more space to accommodate more people. The Linh-Son Buddhist Youth Association is very active and enjoys events such as cookouts and camping trips. The activities of this group are organized very much like Boy/Girl Scouts.

References

Asian-American culture in Austin, Texas
Buddhist temples in Texas
Religious buildings and structures in Austin, Texas
Vietnamese-American culture in Texas
1998 establishments in Texas